The year 1727 in architecture involved some significant events.

Buildings and structures

Buildings

 The baroque Catholic church of Santiago Apóstol is built in Albatera, Spain.
 The first Palladian villa in Scotland, Mavisbank House, designed by William Adam in collaboration with his client, Sir John Clerk of Penicuik, is completed.
 Widcombe Manor House, Bath, England.
 Church of Saint Maurice (Ebersmunster) in Alsace, designed by Peter Thumb, is completed.
 Trinitarian Church of Bratislava sanctified.
 Baclayon Church in the Philippines rebuilt in stone.
 Virga Jesse church, Hasselt, Flanders, built.
 First Presbyterian Church (Trenton, New Jersey) built.
 Construction of Menshikov Palace (Saint Petersburg) (opened 1711) is completed.
 Pilgrimage Church of Saint John of Nepomuk, Grünberg (Zelená hora), Bohemia, designed by Jan Santini Aichel, is completed.

Awards
 Grand Prix de Rome, architecture: François Gallot.

Births
 Johann Nepomuk Fuchs, Lower Styrian church architect (d. 1804)
 Pierre-Louis Moreau-Desproux, French neoclassical architect (d. 1793)

Deaths
 April 18 – Matthias Steinl, Austrian baroque sculptor and architect (b. c.1644)

References

architecture
Years in architecture
18th-century architecture